Raigamayai Gampalayai is a 2018 Sri Lankan Sinhala comedy film directed by Lalith Premathilake and co-produced by Haren Nagodavithana, Dilini Silva, Harshamana Panditharatne and Kushani Wijesinghe for Tissa Nagodavithana Films. It stars Kumara Thirimadura and Giriraj Kaushalya in lead roles along with Piumi Hansamali and Wijeratne Warakagoda. Music composed by Shantha Peiris.

The film also brings Kumara Thirimadura his maiden cinema playback singing.

Cast
 Giriraj Kaushalya as Raigamaya
 Kumara Thirimadura as Gampalaya
 Piumi Hansamali as Siriyalatha
 Wijeratne Warakagoda as Arachchi, Village Head
 Rohit Mannage as Aaron mudalali
 Laxman Amarasekara as Thegiris, Arachchi's servant
 Malki Fernando
 Isuru Navoda
 Samitha Madushan
 Kaushi Tillakratne
 Hemantha Jayalath
 Ananda Wijethilake
 Buddhika Edirisinghe

References

External links
 
Official facebook page
රයිගමයයි ගම්පලයයි රිදී තිරයට
රයිගමයයි ගම්පළයයි ළමයින්ට පමණයි

2018 films
2010s Sinhala-language films
2018 comedy films
Sri Lankan comedy films